The third season of the historical drama television series Vikings premiered on February 19, 2015 on History in Canada, and concluded on April 23, 2015, consisting of ten episodes. The series broadly follows the exploits of the legendary Viking chieftain Ragnar Lothbrok and his crew, and later those of his sons. The first season of the series begins at the start of the Viking Age, marked by the Lindisfarne raid in 793.

The third season follows the development of Ragnar's family, and the Vikings as they become more entwined in English mingling affairs, and also begin to raid farther afield.

Cast

Main
 Travis Fimmel as King Ragnar Lothbrok, the head of the Viking earldom of Kattegat who became king after Horik's death
 Katheryn Winnick as Lagertha, a shield-maiden and Ragnar's ex-wife; she controls the Earldom of Hedeby calling herself Earl Ingstad.
 Clive Standen as Rollo, a warrior and Ragnar's brother
 Jessalyn Gilsig as Siggy, widow of Earl Haraldson and Rollo's lover
 Gustaf Skarsgård as Floki, a gifted shipbuilder and friend of Ragnar's
 George Blagden as Athelstan, an Anglo-Saxon monk from Northumbria who is torn between the Viking gods and the Christian God; he is a friend and adviser to both King Ragnar and King Ecbert.
 Alexander Ludwig as Bjorn Ironside, Ragnar and Lagertha's son, who has fallen in love with the shield-maiden Þórunn
 Alyssa Sutherland as Queen Aslaug, Brynhildrs daughter and Ragnar's second wife
 Ben Robson as Kalf, the ruler of Hedeby in the absence of Lagertha
 Linus Roache as the ruthless King Ecbert of Wessex
 Kevin Durand as Harbard, a wanderer
 Lothaire Bluteau as Emperor Charles of West Francia

Recurring
 Amy Bailey as Princess/Queen Kwenthrith of Mercia
 Moe Dunford as Prince Aethelwulf of Wessex, son of King Ecbert
 Maude Hirst as Helga, Floki's wife
 Gaia Weiss as Þórunn (/θorunn/), a freed slave and Björn's love interest
 Jefferson Hall as Torstein, one of Ragnar's warriors
 Jennie Jacques as Princess Judith of Northumbria, daughter of King Ælle, wedded to Aethelwulf
 John Kavanagh as the Seer, a seiðmann
 Steve Wall as Einar, a relative of late Jarl Sigvard and an opponent of Lagertha in Hedeby
 Cathal O'Hallin as Hvitserk, second son of Ragnar and Aslaug
 Cormac Melia as Ubbe, eldest son of Ragnar and Aslaug
 Philip O'Sullivan as Bishop Edmund, serving at the court of King Ecbert
 Aaron Monaghan as Prince Burgred, the younger brother of Princess Kwenthrith
 Edvin Endre as Erlendur, son of King Horik
 Georgia Hirst as Torvi, the widow of Jarl Borg and the new wife of Erlendur
 Greg Orvis as Earl Siegfried, one of the Viking commanders in the siege of Paris
 Frankie McCafferty as Sinric, a polyglot drifter
 Owen Roe as Count Odo of Paris
 Morgane Polanski as Princess Gisla of West Francia, the daughter of Emperor Charles
 Huw Parmenter as Roland, Count Odo's first-in-command and Therese's brother
 Mark Huberman as Louis, a soldier in Paris
 Karen Hassan as Therese, Roland's sister and Count Odo's mistress

Guests
 Ian Beattie as King Brihtwulf of Mercia
 Ivan Kaye as King Aelle of Northumbria
 Elinor Crawley as Thyri, Earl Haraldson and Siggy's daughter
 Søren Pilmark as Stender, a farmer who escaped Wessex after Aethelwulf's raid
 Eddie Drew as Odin, appearing in Ragnar's visions
 Carl Shaaban as Jesus, appearing in Ragnar's visions
 James Murphy as Ansgar, a monk who is trying to convert Vikings in Kattegat

Episodes

Production

Development
An Irish-Canadian co-production presented by Metro-Goldwyn-Mayer, Vikings was developed and produced by Octagon Films and Take 5 Productions. Morgan O'Sullivan, Sheila Hockin, Sherry Marsh, Alan Gasmer, James Flynn, John Weber, and Michael Hirst are credited as executive producers. This season was produced by Steve Wakefield and Keith Thompson. Bill Goddard and Séamus McInerney are co-producers.

The production team for this season includes casting directors Frank and Nuala Moiselle, costume designer Joan Bergin, visual effects supervisors Julian Parry and Dominic Remane, stunt action designers Franklin Henson and Richard Ryan, composer Trevor Morris, production designer Mark Geraghty, editors Aaron Marshall for the first, third, fifth, seventh and ninth episodes, and Tad Seaborn for the second, fourth, sixth, eighth and tenth episodes, and cinematographer PJ Dillon.

Music

The musical score for the third season was composed by Trevor Morris in collaboration with Einar Selvik and Steve Tavaglione. The opening sequence is again accompanied by the song "If I Had a Heart" by Fever Ray.

The soundtrack album was released on May 15, 2015 by Sony Classical Records. Two additional pieces not included in the album are Selvik's original songs "Voluspá"—featured in "Born Again" and briefly incorporated in the score track "Floki Appears to Kill Athelstan"—and "Heljarlokk", written by Selvik and Lindy-Fay Hella and featured in "The Dead". "Voluspá" was released as a single by Wardruna on November 9, 2018.

Additional non-original music by Norwegian music group Wardruna is featured in the episodes "The Wanderer", "Paris", "To the Gates!" and "Breaking Point". The featured tracks—which were not included in the soundtrack release—are "Helvegen", "Løyndomsriss", "Heimta Thurs", "Algir — Tognatale", "Rotlaust Tre Fell", "Sowelu", "IwaR", "IngwaR" and "Ár var alda".

Historical church music performed by Marcel Pérès & Ensemble Organum is included in the episode "The Dead".

Music by Canadian throat singer Tanya Tagaq is also featured in this season's soundtrack; the vocals in Tagaq's "Uja" are sampled in the score track "Battle for the Hill of the Ash", which plays in the episode "Warrior's Fate", while the song "Howl" is featured in the episode "The Dead".

Reception

Critical response
The review aggregator website Rotten Tomatoes reported a 100% approval rating, with an average rating of 8/10 based on 11 reviews. The critical consensus reads: "Vikings continues its onslaught of engrossing action, intrigue, and characters, led by Michael Hirst's strong vision of Norse legend." On Metacritic, which uses a weighted average, it scored 81 out of 100, based on seven reviews, indicating "universal acclaim".

References

External links
 
 

2015 Canadian television seasons
2015 Irish television seasons